Hornets Rugby Football Club is an English rugby union team based in Weston-super-Mare, Somerset. The club runs three senior teams, a ladies team and the full range of junior teams. The first XV currently play in National Two West following their promotion from the South West Premier in 2022. The club also has a second XV which plays in the Tribute Somerset Premier and a third XV which plays in the Tribute Somerset 2 North.

Current standings

Honours
1st team:
 Somerset 1 champions: 1992–93
 Somerset Senior Cup winners (5): 1995, 2015, 2016, 2018, 2022
 Western Counties North champions (2): 1998–99, 2012–13 
 Bristol Combination Cup winners (3): 1999, 2003, 2020
 Somerset Premier champions: 2010–11
 South West 1 West champions (2): 2013–14, 2019–20

2nd team:
 Somerset 2 North champions: 2012–13
 Somerset 1 champions: 2014–15

3rd team:
 Somerset 3 South champions (2): 2010–11, 2012–13

References

External links
 Official club website

English rugby union teams
1962 establishments in England
Rugby clubs established in 1962
Rugby union in Somerset
Sport in Weston-super-Mare